A Royal Divorce is a 1938 British historical drama film directed by Jack Raymond and starring Ruth Chatterton, Pierre Blanchar and Frank Cellier. The film portrays the complex relationship between Napoleon I of France and his wife, Josephine Bonaparte from their first meeting until their divorce more than a decade later.

Cast
 Ruth Chatterton as Josephine de Beauharnais  
 Pierre Blanchar as Napoleon Bonaparte  
 Frank Cellier as Talleyrand  
 Carol Goodner as Mme. Tallien  
 Auriol Lee as Napoleon's Mother  
 George Curzon as Barras  
 Laurence Hanray as Klemens von Metternich  
 John Laurie as Joseph Bonaparte  
 Jack Hawkins as Captain Charles  
 Rosalyn Boulter as Hortense  
 Allan Jeayes as Marat  
 Moran Caplat as Eugene  
 Romilly Lunge as Junot  
 Hubert Harben as DeTracy  
 David Farrar as Louis Bonaparte

Critical reception
TV Guide called the film a "mediocre adaptation", while Allmovie wrote, "in terms of costumes and settings, A Royal Divorce is authentic to a fault; in terms of adherence to the facts, it's a bit shaky, though undeniably dramatic.

See also
 A Royal Divorce (1926)
 Cultural depictions of Napoleon I of France

References

External links
 

1930s historical drama films
1938 films
British historical drama films
British biographical drama films
Films about Napoleon
1930s English-language films
Films directed by Jack Raymond
1930s biographical drama films
British black-and-white films
Remakes of British films
Sound film remakes of silent films
Cultural depictions of Joséphine de Beauharnais
Cultural depictions of Charles Maurice de Talleyrand-Périgord
Cultural depictions of Klemens von Metternich
Paramount Pictures films
1938 drama films
1930s British films